Tityus obscurus, known as the Amazonian black scorpion, is a species of scorpion found in northern South America.

Description and behavior 
It is one of the largest Tityus species, growing up to 65–100 mm. More characterized by its black color, flattened body and legs and claws that are relatively thin, something specific to this species. It is terrestrial and nocturnal, during the day it hides under stones, logs or loose bark, venturing out at night to hunt its prey, chiefly insects and arthropods. Juveniles have a brown body and appendix, stained with dark.

Range and habitat 
They are found in the tropical and sub-tropical forests of northern South America (Brazil, French Guiana and Suriname), mainly in the amazon rainforest.

Venom 
They have excitatory neurotoxins and cardiotoxins, symptoms already reported in humans include severe local pain, edema, profuse sweating, nausea, vomiting, spreading numbness, muscle twitch, convulsions, semicoma, somnolence, hallucinations, tachypnea, tachycardia, excessive drooling and prostration. In Guyana, a 16-year-old boy died 16 hours after being stung by this species. In Guyana, in a 12-month period three people died, two children and a 30-year-old man, both had local pain, and soon developed to vomiting and persistent leukocytosis, both died after developing cardiopulmonary failure and dysrhythmias. The median lethal dose for this species is 3.13 mg / kg (i.p.).

Presumably, Tityus obscurus has been responsible for acute cerebellar dysfunction, with neuromuscular manifestations in 58 patients in Santarém, Pará, Brazil, where symptoms were reported lasting up to two days, such as cerebellar ataxia, dysdiadochokinesia, dysmetria, dysarthria, dyslalia, nausea and vomiting; some patients presented myoclonus and fasciculations, two had intense rhabdomyolysis and acute kidney injury.

References 

obscurus
Scorpions of South America